The women's 200 m butterfly at the 2009 World Championships took place on 29 July (heats and semifinals) and on the evening of 30 July (finals) at the Foro Italico in Rome, Italy.

Records
Prior to this competition, the existing world and competition records were as follows:

The following records were established during the competition:

Results

Heats

Semifinals

Finals

See also
Swimming at the 2007 World Aquatics Championships – Women's 200 metre butterfly
Swimming at the 2008 Summer Olympics – Women's 200 metre butterfly

References

Worlds 2009 results: Women's 200m Butterfly Prelims, from OmegaTiming.com (official timer of the 2009 Worlds); retrieved 2009-07-29.
Worlds 2009 results: Women's 200m Butterfly Semifinals, from OmegaTiming.com (official timer of the 2009 Worlds); retrieved 2009-07-29.
Finals Results

Butterfly Women's 200 m
2009 in women's swimming